Neocrepidodera puncticollis is a species of flea beetle from Chrysomelidae family that can be found in Romania, Slovakia, and Ukraine.

References

Beetles described in 1879
Beetles of Europe
puncticollis